The National Anthem Ordinance is an ordinance of Hong Kong intended to criminalise "insults to the national anthem of China" ("March of the Volunteers"). It is a local law in response to the Law of the People’s Republic of China on the National Anthem (the National Anthem Law). Chinese Communist Party General Secretary Xi Jinping made a speech regarding the national anthem legislation in early 2017. The ordinance commenced on 12 June 2020.

Content
The ordinance consists of 6 parts.

Part 1 serves as the preliminary, explicitly defining concepts such as “national anthem” and “national flag”.

Part 2 dictates regulations regarding the playing and singing of the national anthem, for example compelling citizens to “stand solemnly and deport themselves with dignity” during the playing of the national anthem.

Part 3 depicts the protection of the national anthem. It prohibits citizens from using the national anthem in certain settings, such as for commercial purposes or as background music. It also bans citizens from insulting the national anthem in any way, such as altering its lyrics or singing it in a distorted way.

Part 4 concerns the promotion of the national anthem. It dictates that primary and secondary educations must incorporate the national anthem in their curriculum, including its singing, history and the etiquette regarding it. It also requires all sound and television broadcasters to play the national anthem when requested by the Communication Authority.

Part 5 contains supplementary provisions. It states that in case of inconsistencies between this ordinance and the Law of the People's Republic of China on National Anthem adopted by the NPC, this ordinance should be applied.

Part 6 contains consequential amendments to other ordinances, for example adding passages regarding the use of national anthem to the Trade Marks Ordinance.

Background
The Hong Kong-Central Government relations grew tenser following the 2014 Hong Kong protests and often lead to Hongkongers openly booing the Chinese national anthem at sporting matches. The first incident was during the match against the Maldives in the 2018 FIFA World Cup qualification at Mong Kok Stadium in June 2015, when the fans booed while the national anthem was played ahead of the game. The booing reoccurred during another match against Qatar in September 2015. FIFA issued a warning to the Hong Kong Football Association (HKFA) over the conduct of fans, and issued a fine of 5,000CHF to Qatar. The HKFA was fined for 10,000CHF (HK$77,150) again for booing the anthem before a home game against China on 17 November 2015.

In response, the Chinese central government made known its intention to have a national anthem law applied to Hong Kong as well as the mainland, arguing it would help foster social values and promote patriotism. The law of the People's Republic of China on the National Anthem (the National Anthem Law) was adopted at the 29th session of the Standing Committee of the 12th National People's Congress (NPCSC) on 1 September 2017, and came into force on the Mainland on 1 October 2017. The law sets out rules to use the national anthem. It would bar use of the anthem in commercial advertisements, and require attendees at events to stand up straight "solemnly" when the anthem plays. Those who violate the new law, including those who modify the lyrics or mock the song or play it during "inappropriate" occasions, could be detained for up to 15 days or face criminal prosecution.

On 4 November 2017, the NPCSC adopted the decision to add the National Anthem Law to Annex III of the Basic Law of Hong Kong. In accordance with Article 18(2) of the Basic Law, the national laws listed in Annex III to the Basic Law shall be applied locally by way of promulgation or legislation by the Hong Kong Special Administrative Region (HKSAR).

Developments 
On 8 January 2019, the Executive Council drafted the national anthem bill and submitted it to the Legislative Council (LegCo) two weeks later. After its first reading, the legislation process was successfully blocked by pro-democracy councillors, and later by months of social unrest caused by 2019–20 Hong Kong protests until its summer recess in July.

After the start of the new session in October 2019, Starry Lee, a pro-establishment councillor, stepped down from her position of the chairperson of the House Committee in order to participate in re-election. Dennis Kwok, a legislator belonging to the Civic Party, thus presided over the committee as Deputy Chair. Pan-democratic legislators have since then employed a tactic some referred to as “filibustering”, holding lengthy discussions on issues such as the extent of authority the police force has within the LegCo building or the operation of LegCo under COVID-19, successfully delaying the re-election of chairperson. Since a chair must be elected in the House Committee before any bills can be discussed, the national anthem bill was effectively blocked.

On 8 May 2020, Lee, after declaring the authority to preside over a committee meeting to end the months-long legislation deadlock, physically occupied the vacant committee chair, citing her previous occupancy of the chair in 2019. Pro-Beijing lawmakers and security staff kept pro-democracy lawmakers at bay for the committee meeting, with Lee urging lawmakers to take their seats, stating "I have not seized power, I am the incumbent chairperson of the house committee". Scuffles broke out, with at least one pro-democracy lawmaker reportedly injured. Most of the pro-democracy lawmakers eventually walked out. Lee and LegCo legal adviser Connie Fung stated Lee could preside due to the abnormal situation where a chair had not been elected for six months due to filibustering by pro-democracy lawmakers. The director of Hong Kong Watch stated "The current logjam in LegCo is a direct result of a broken system where the only strategy that the democrats have, despite representing the majority, is filibustering." Reports stated that Lee intends to criminalise disrespect of the Chinese national anthem, and also intends to re-attempt to introduce article 23 national security laws.

On 28 May 2020, the bill passed its second reading. Pan-democracy legislator Ted Hui dropped a rotten plant in front of LegCo president Andrew Leung in protest, for which he was later fined.

On 4 June 2020, the bill passed its third reading, with 41 legislators in favour of it and 1 against. 41 out of 42 pro-establishment legislators voted in favour of it, except the chairperson Leung who abstained. 1 out of 23 pan-democracy legislators voted against it, with the others abstaining, in protest. Before the voting, pan-democracy legislators Raymond Chan and Eddie Chu splashed a jar of reeking liquid in front of the rostrum in protest, accusing Andrew Leung of being a “rubber stamp” and that what he did will “reek for ten thousand years”. They were later fined for their action.

On 11 June 2020, the National Anthem Ordinance was signed by the Chief Executive Carrie Lam. It came into force on the next day after it was published in the Hong Kong Government Gazette.

On 30 July 2021, police made its first arrest under the law. The detainee was a 40-year-old man who had allegedly urged people to boo the Chinese national anthem as it was played at a live screening of an Olympics award ceremony in a shopping mall in Kwun Tong.

Concerns
Craig Choy of the Progressive Lawyers Group said it was impractical to expect all the waiters and customers at a local eatery to stand up when the national anthem is heard on TV, and suggested that local stations should stop playing it in order to avoid controversy. University of Hong Kong principal law lecturer Eric Cheung also said will be unrealistic to include a provision on requiring one to stand. He also said it "would be quite scary" if "you'd have to follow the ideology and expressions of socialism in mainland China."

Eric Cheung said that the "ideological" and "guidance" provisions of the government's proposed national anthem law, including a clause stating that primary and secondary schools would need to teach pupils to sing and understand the history of "March of the Volunteers", was a "complete deviation" from common law norms. In the mainland version of the law, "secondary and primary schools shall regard the national anthem as an important component in education to promote patriotism, organise students to learn to sing the national anthem, and teach students on the history and spirit of the national anthem and to observe the etiquette for performing and singing the national anthem". Cheung said that if the provision is stated but it does not punish the offender, there may be those who deliberately engage in such an act and it would diminish the solemnity and dignity of the law.

In response to the concerns and call for a white bill and public consultation, Chief Executive Carrie Lam dismissed it by stating that "I do not understand why one has to insist on the term 'public consultation'," calling the term only a "label". She also insisted the proposed bill only targets people who deliberately insult the national anthem and the residents do not need to worry about it.

See also
 Act on National Flag and Anthem (in Japan)
 China–Hong Kong football rivalry
 Glory to Hong Kong

References

External links
 Legislative Council Panel on Constitutional Affairs - Local Legislation to Implement the National Anthem Law

2020 in law
2020 in Hong Kong
Hong Kong legislation
Human rights in Hong Kong
Political repression in Hong Kong